Tomari Station (泊駅) is the name of three train stations in Japan:

 Tomari Station (Mie)
 Tomari Station (Toyama)
 Tomari Station (Tottori)